The Boat Basin Park, is situated at Boat Basin, Clifton, Karachi. In the 1960s, the Karachi Development Authority built the 240 acre park. It was then owned by the Karachi Metropolitan Corporation and the Government of Karachi.

See also 
 List of parks and gardens in Pakistan
 List of parks and gardens in Lahore
 List of parks and gardens in Karachi

References

External links

Parks in Karachi
Clifton, Karachi